Franciscus Hubertus Johannes Carpay (13 July 1917 – 12 September 1985) was a Dutch-born New Zealand industrial designer.

Early life
Carpay was born in Heusden, Netherlands, and trained at the Hertogenbosch Technical School in Hertogenbosch.

He left the company in 1950 and travelled to the south of France where he met Pablo Picasso and worked at the Madoura Pottery in Valauris in 1950. At Picasso's insistence, Carpay met with two other pottery decorators, Roger Capron and Roger Picault, also working in Vallauris.

Entrepreneurship
Carpay established his own small commercial pottery in Tegelen. The business was not successful, and he returned to work as a graphic designer.

Move to New Zealand
While unemployed, Carpay had written to John Allum, the Mayor of Auckland, New Zealand, asking for the name of a pottery where he could find work. This letter was passed to Tom Clark of Crown Lynn who was developing a "Specials Department" and actively recruiting. Carpay arrived in 1953 and joined other artisans including Mirek Smisek and Ernest Shufflebotham. The intent of the "Specials Department" was to produce more upmarket works from Crown Lynn's existing commercial production-line wares. Carpay began to use his existing ideas on numerous readymade production line blanks. These one-off designs were meant to go into wider production as part of the Handwerk range but although his work was accepted into art society exhibition and was critically acclaimed the designs were not well received by consumers. In 1956 Carpay was made redundant.

Carpay remained in New Zealand and tried to obtain graphic design related work. Unable to do so he exhibited paintings, gave pottery decorating demonstrations and completed mural commissions. Carpay also taught at Howick District High School. The art equipment and resources of the school allowed him to develop his screen-printing techniques in the late 1950s and he began to work in fabric design and printing. He established a screen printing studio in his basement and started with placemats inspired by Maori rock drawings. In doing so he joined a number of other artists also using these motifs as artistic inspiration at the time including Theo Schoon, A. R. D. Fairburn and Gordon Walters.

He was elected to membership of the New Zealand Society of Industrial Designers (NZSID) soon after its establishment in 1960, and served on its council to 1968.

Other ventures
Carpay developed his screenprinting business Frank Carpay Designs Limited and branched out into beach towels and beach wear printing onto white towelling. When a shipment of imported fabric was found to be faulty in the early 1970s the business was unable to survive, and he returned to design commissions.

Personal life
Frank Carpay died in 1985. In 2000 his wife donated an extensive collection of hisceramics, textiles, drawings and prints to the Hawke’s Bay Museum.

Gallery

List of works
 Works in the collection of Museum of New Zealand Te Papa Tongarewa

Further reading

References

1917 births
1985 deaths
Dutch emigrants to New Zealand
Industrial designers
New Zealand industrial designers